The 6th Screen Awards also The Sixth Annual Screen–Videocon Awards ceremony, presented by Indian Express Group, honored the best Indian Hindi-language films of 1999. The ceremony was held on 23 January 2000 at Andheri Sports Complex, Mumbai, and hosted by Lisa Ray and Cyrus Broacha. The event was telecasted same day on DD National 10:30 PM, and was re-telecasted on 29 January, StarPlus 09:30 PM.

Hum Dil De Chuke Sanam led the ceremony with 18 nominations, followed by Taal with 11 nominations and Sarfarosh with 10 nominations.

Hum Dil De Chuke Sanam won 10 awards, including Best Film, Best Director (for Sanjay Leela Bhansali) and Best Actress (for Aishwarya Rai), thus becoming the most-awarded film at the ceremony.

Awards 

The winners and nominees have been listed below. Winners are listed first, highlighted in boldface, and indicated with a double dagger.

Jury Awards

Technical Awards

Special awards

Superlatives

References

External links 
 The Screen Awards (2000) at the Internet Movie Database

Screen Awards